The 1840 United States presidential election in Rhode Island took place between October 30 and December 2, 1840, as part of the 1840 United States presidential election. Voters chose four representatives, or electors to the Electoral College, who voted for President and Vice President.

Rhode Island voted for the Whig candidate, William Henry Harrison, over Democratic candidate Martin Van Buren. Harrison won Rhode Island by a margin of 22.93%.

With 61.22% of the popular vote, Rhode Island would be Harrison's third strongest state in the 1840 election after Kentucky and Vermont.

Results

See also
 United States presidential elections in Rhode Island

References

Rhode Island
1840
1840 Rhode Island elections